Dr. V. Alban (died 18 March 1999) was an Indian politician and Member of the Legislative Assembly. He was elected to the Tamil Nadu legislative assembly as a Dravida Munnetra Kazhagam candidate from the Thiruvattar constituency in Kanyakumari district in the 1996 election. 

Alban died on 18 March 1999.

References 

Dravida Munnetra Kazhagam politicians
1999 deaths
Year of birth missing
Tamil Nadu MLAs 1996–2001